Þjóðhátíð ("National Festival") is an annual outdoor festival held in Vestmannaeyjar, Iceland, on the weekend before the first Monday in August. Locals and guests gather in Herjólfsdalur valley on the island of Heimaey for four days of various events, most prominently big stage concerts, bonfires, fireworks displays and the festival's signature Sunday night crowd singing. The crowd singing is the single event of the weekend which draws the most attendees. In 2010 there was a record attendance of between 16,000 and 17,000 on the Sunday night. The local sports district association ÍBV (Íþróttabandalag Vestmannaeyja) organises and runs the festival.

Most participants stay in tents in and around the Herjólfsdalur valley. Hotels are also booked out as well as homestays being rented out for the weekend. Transport to and from the island is provided by the Herjólfur ferry to Landeyjarhöfn and flights from Vestmannaeyjar Airport. Private companies also operate smaller boat trips as well as flights to Bakki Airport.

History 
Þjóðhátíð was first held in 1874 when islanders were prevented by bad weather from attending the celebration on the Icelandic mainland of the millennium of Icelandic settlement. The festival has grown to become the largest multiday festival in Iceland, and one of the largest annual cultural events in the country.

Due to the COVID-19 pandemic, the festival was not held in 2020 or 2021, the first time it has not been held due to WW1 in 1914 and 1915; Þjóðhátið was held in 1973 despite the eruption on the island.

After a 2-year break, the festival took place in 2022 with around a 15,000 participants on Sunday.

Brekkusöngur 
The festival's signature Sunday night sing-along is known as brekkusöngur (lit. hill-song), named after the hill that forms the natural amphitheater from which visitors watch the main stage.

From 1977 until 2012, the sing-along was led by Vestmannaeyjar local Árni Johnsen, a member of the Althing (Icelandic parliament), with the exception of the 2003 Þjóðhátíð when Róbert Marshall filled in as Árni sat in jail. From 2013 the sing-along was led by Ingólfur Þórarinsson, another Vestmannaeyjar local. Ingólfur was slated to lead the sing-along again in 2021 but the organising committee cancelled after anonymous allegations of sexual harassment, assault and inappropriate behavior towards underage girls, despite him denying the allegations. There is an ongoing defamation case in the Court of Appeal from Ingólfur after having lost his case in the Reykjavík District Court.

Magnús Kjartan led the sing-along for the 2022 Þjóðhátíð.

External links
 Official festival site

References

Music festivals in Iceland
Vestmannaeyjar
Annual events in Iceland
1874 establishments in Iceland
Recurring events established in 1874
Folk festivals in Iceland
Music festivals established in 1874
Festivals established in 1874
Summer events in Iceland